"Go Big or Go Home" is a song recorded by American pop rock band American Authors as the first single from their second studio album, What We Live For. The song was released on May 18, 2015.

Promotion
"Go Big or Go Home" was released on digital retailers on May 18, 2015. The new album is scheduled to be released later this year via Island Records. The official lyric video premiered via Vevo on June 27, 2015. The band filmed the proper music video directed by Ethan Lader, in late May and it was premiered on July 10, 2015. The single was written by Zachary Barnett, Matt Sanchez, James Adam Shelley, Shep Goodman, Aaron Accetta and Jonnie Davis.

Usage in media
 The song was used in a promo for the 19th season of Bizarre Foods with Andrew Zimmern.
 The song is also used by CBS Sports in advertisements to promote their upcoming televised college football schedule.
 The song was used in the official trailer for Paramount's 2019 animated film, Wonder Park.

Track listing

Charts

Weekly charts

Year-end charts

References

2015 songs
2015 singles
American Authors songs
Island Records singles
Songs written by Aaron Accetta
Songs written by Shep Goodman
Song recordings produced by Aaron Accetta
Animated music videos